Paul Barnett, OAM (born 8 July 1980)  is an Australian Paralympic swimmer.  At the 2000 Sydney Games, he won a gold medal in the Men's 100 m Breaststroke SB9 event, for which he received a Medal of the Order of Australia, and a bronze medal in the Men's 4 × 100 m Medley 34 pts event.

Personal
He was born 8 July 1980 in Perth, Western Australia. Barnett graduated from Mount Lawley Senior High, in Perth, Western Australia. He attended Mt Lawley for five years and developed his love of sport there, especially swimming and became the captain of the school's swimming team, beating able bodied swimmers consistently. He first became Murdoch House captain and then school swimming team captain and finally represented WA as a state swimmer. He set himself the goal of gold at the 2000 Olympics in 1996.

References

Male Paralympic swimmers of Australia
Swimmers at the 2000 Summer Paralympics
Paralympic gold medalists for Australia
Paralympic bronze medalists for Australia
Recipients of the Medal of the Order of Australia
Living people
Medalists at the 2000 Summer Paralympics
1970 births
Paralympic medalists in swimming
Australian male breaststroke swimmers
S9-classified Paralympic swimmers